is a Japanese professional wrestler currently working for the Japanese professional wrestling promotion DDT Pro-Wrestling (DDT).

Professional wrestling career

Independent circuit (2016–present)
Ueno made his professional wrestling debut at the 2016 edition of "Who's Gonna Top?" in a time-limit draw dark match against Akito. Throughout his career so far, he has worked mostly for DDT, but had several matches for other promotions such as Dradition where he worked alongside famous wrestlers such as Masato Tanaka, Yukio Sakaguchi and Super Tiger II.

In May 2017, he was a participant in Kaientai Dojo's K-Metal League Tournament of which he reached but ultimately lost the final against Go Asakawa.

He won the first title of his career at DDT's 21st Anniversary show, the KO-D 6-Man Tag Team Championship with Koju Takeda and Kota Umeda after defeating Shuten-Dōji (Kudo, Masahiro Takanashi and Yukio Sakaguchi) in a six-man tag team match. He also won the KO-D Tag Team Championship with his tag team partner Naomi Yoshimura at DDT's 2020 New Year Special after defeating Damnation (Daisuke Sasaki and Soma Takao). Ueno defeated Chris Brookes at Ultimate Party 2020 to win the DDT Universal Championship on November 11. He is also a six-time holder of the comedic Ironman Heavymetalweight Championship, winning it for the first time at DDT Beer Garden 2019 after drinking a beer can. At Judgement 2020: DDT 23rd Anniversary, on March 20, 2020, Ueno teamed up with fellow Disaster Box stablemates Naomichi Marufuji and Harashima to defeat All Out (Akito, Yuki Iino and Royce Chambers).

Championships and accomplishments
DDT Pro-Wrestling
DDT Universal Championship (2 times)
KO-D Tag Team Championship (1 time) – with Naomi Yoshimura
KO-D 6-Man Tag Team Championship (1 time) – with Kota Umeda and Koju Takeda
KO-D 10-Man Tag Team Championship (1 time, current) – with Mao, Shunma Katsumata, Toui Kojima and Shinya Aoki
Ironman Heavymetalweight Championship (6 times)
D-Oh Grand Prix (2022)
Other accomplishments
Differ Cup (2017) – with Konosuke Takeshita
Pro Wrestling Illustrated
 Ranked No. 143 of the top 500 singles wrestlers in the PWI 500 in 2021

References 

1995 births
Living people
Japanese male professional wrestlers
21st-century professional wrestlers
DDT Universal Champions
KO-D 6-Man Tag Team Champions
KO-D Tag Team Champions